Wander do Prado Moura (born 22 February 1969) is a retired long-distance runner from Brazil, who won the gold medal in the men's 3000 metres steeplechase at the 1995 Pan American Games in Mar del Plata, Argentina. His winning time of 8:14.41 at the event was a Games record, Brazilian record and a South American record for the event.

He competed at the 1993 World Championships in Athletics, representing Brazil, but did not manage to progress to the steeplechase final. He had success at continental level, however, and won a silver medal at the South American Championships in Athletics in 1991 and became the continental champion in 1997.

International competitions
8 Times Brazilian champion in 3000  steeplechase

 1996
13:36:86 Triton Stadium Meeting Record San Diego CA USA - 5000m
Gold 1st
3:41.84 Triton Stadium Meeting Record San Diego CA USA - 1500m
Gold 1st
08:14:41  South American Record
08:14 41 Brazilian Record since 1995 
08:14 41 South American Record since 1995 
08:14 41 Pan American Games Record since 1995
5:24.36 Brazilian and South American Record 1995

References

External links
 

1969 births
Living people
Brazilian male steeplechase runners
Athletes (track and field) at the 1995 Pan American Games
Place of birth missing (living people)
Brazilian male long-distance runners
Pan American Games gold medalists for Brazil
Pan American Games silver medalists for Brazil
Pan American Games medalists in athletics (track and field)
Medalists at the 1995 Pan American Games
20th-century Brazilian people
21st-century Brazilian people